is a former Japanese football player. She played for Japan national team.

Club career
Nakachi was born in Chiba Prefecture on 16 December 1980. She played for Nippon TV Beleza from 1997 to 2010. She was selected Best Young Player award in 1997 season. She played 187 matches in L.League and she was selected Best Eleven 4 times (2000, 2001, 2003 and 2006). The club won L.League championship 8 times.

National team career
In December 1997, when Nakachi was 16 years old, she was selected Japan national team for 1997 AFC Championship. At this competition, on 5 December, she debuted against Guam. She played at 1998, 2002 Asian Games, 2001 and 2003 AFC Championship. She was also a member of Japan for 1999 and 2003 World Cup. She played 30 games for Japan until 2008.

National team statistics

References

External links
 

1980 births
Living people
Japan Women's College of Physical Education alumni
Association football people from Chiba Prefecture
Japanese women's footballers
Japan women's international footballers
Nadeshiko League players
Nippon TV Tokyo Verdy Beleza players
1999 FIFA Women's World Cup players
2003 FIFA Women's World Cup players
Footballers at the 1998 Asian Games
Footballers at the 2002 Asian Games
Women's association football midfielders
Asian Games bronze medalists for Japan
Asian Games medalists in football
Medalists at the 1998 Asian Games
Medalists at the 2002 Asian Games